Captain Robert Alexander (24 September 1910  – 19 July 1943) was an Irish rugby union and cricket player who represented Ireland at both sports during the 1930s. He also played rugby for both the British Lions and the Barbarians. Alexander, an RUC officer, was killed in action during the Second World War while serving with the Royal Inniskilling Fusiliers.

Rugby international

Ireland
Between 1936 and 1939 Alexander made 11 appearances and scored 1 try for Ireland. He made his debut in a 6–3 win against England on 8 February 1936 at Lansdowne Road. On 27 February 1937, again at Lansdowne, he scored his one try for Ireland in an 11–4 win against Scotland. He made his last appearance for Ireland on 11 March 1939 in a 7–0 defeat against Wales at Ravenhill.

British Lions
In 1938 Alexander, together with fellow Ireland international Paddy Mayne, was also a member of the British Lions squad that went on a tour of South Africa.

Cricket international
As a cricketer, Alexander was a right-handed batsman and a right-arm fast-medium bowler. He played once for Ireland in a first-class match against Scotland on 18 June 1932

See also
 List of Irish cricket and rugby union players

References

1910 births
1943 deaths
Burials in Sicily
Alumni of Queen's University Belfast
Barbarian F.C. players
British & Irish Lions rugby union players from Ireland
British Army personnel killed in World War II
Irish cricketers
Irish rugby union players
North of Ireland F.C. players
Cricketers from Belfast
Royal Inniskilling Fusiliers officers
Royal Ulster Constabulary officers
Ulster Rugby players
Ulster Scots people
Ireland international rugby union players
Rugby union players from Belfast
Military personnel from Belfast
Police officers from Belfast
Rugby union flankers